On January 20, 1994, residents of Edmonton's Ward 3 elected an alderman to replace Judy Bethel, who had resigned after being elected to the House of Commons of Canada.  All candidates ran as independents.

Results

(bold indicates elected, italics indicate incumbent)

References
City of Edmonton: Edmonton Elections

1994
1994 elections in Canada
1994 in Alberta